Enoplopteron is a genus of tephritid or fruit flies in the family Tephritidae.

References

Trypetinae
Tephritidae genera